Ilya Aleksandrovich Borodin (born 14 February 2003)  is a Russian swimmer. He is the 2020 European Champions in the men's 400 m individual medley. He also won gold medals in the 200 m and 400 m individual medley events at the 2019 European Youth Summer Olympic Festival.

Borodin took up swimming aged seven. He missed the 2021 Summer Olympics because of a positive COVID-19 test. In the 400 metre individual medley event of the 2021 World Championships in Abu Dhabi he won the silver medal behind Daiya Seto establishing a world junior record and European record with a time of 3:56.47.

References

External links 
Ilya Borodin at FINA

2003 births
Living people
Russian male swimmers
Male medley swimmers
European Aquatics Championships medalists in swimming
Sportspeople from Bryansk